Briony McRoberts (10 February 1957 – 17 July 2013) was an English actress.

Career 
On television, she played Tessa Kilpin in "No Stone", the 57th episode of The Professionals, and appeared in television programmes including The Bill, EastEnders, Taggart, The Crezz and Diamonds. She had a regular role as Lady Laird Sam Hagan in the Scottish soap Take the High Road for STV from 1990 to 1999. In 1976, she played Wendy Darling in a musical adaptation of J. M. Barrie's Peter Pan starring Mia Farrow and Danny Kaye on NBC's Hallmark Hall of Fame. In film, she played Margo Fassbender in The Pink Panther Strikes Again (1976) and Ann Underwood in the horror film Edge of Sanity (1989).

On stage, she made many appearances in the West End and the regions including playing Wendy Darling in J.M. Barrie's Peter Pan at the Shaftesbury Theatre in 1980, the musical 'Maggie', also at the Shaftesbury Theatre in 1978 and Charley's Aunt at the Aldwych Theatre in 1983.

Personal life 
She had been an active supporter of Scottish Friends of the Earth's Fight the Fumes campaign. She was married to actor David Robb.

Death 
McRoberts died on 17 July 2013 at Fulham Broadway tube station, West London, after being hit by a District line train. British Transport Police said a file had been sent to the coroner and at the time her death was not being treated as suspicious. McRoberts' agent said that she believed the actress had taken her own life. At an inquest held in Fulham in October 2013 coroner Elizabeth Pygot returned a verdict of suicide and said: "A pathologist and toxicology results found that she had no alcohol, drugs or medication in her system when she died. She had a longstanding battle with anorexia and severe depression and found it difficult to accept medication. Considering the evidence provided I can conclude beyond reasonable doubt that the deceased took her own life. She jumped in front of the tube train and clearly knew what she was doing. She was extremely unhappy and intended to bring her life to an end."

Filmography

References

External links 
 

1957 births
2013 deaths
English stage actresses
People from Welwyn Garden City
Actresses from Hertfordshire
English film actresses
English television actresses
English musical theatre actresses
English soap opera actresses
English activists
English women activists
English people of Scottish descent
20th-century British actresses
21st-century British actresses
Musicians from Hertfordshire
Suicides in Fulham
2013 suicides
20th-century English women
20th-century English people
21st-century English women
21st-century English people
20th-century British businesspeople
Suicides by train